Dale Eftoda is a Canadian politician, who represented the electoral district of Riverdale North in the Yukon Legislative Assembly from 2000 to 2002. He was a member of the Yukon Liberal Party caucus.

Eftoda became the first openly gay member of the Yukon legislature when he introduced his partner in the assembly on November 29, 2001. Prior to his election to the legislature, he was executive director of the AIDS Yukon Alliance, an HIV/AIDS education and service agency in Whitehorse.

He was defeated by Ted Staffen of the Yukon Party in the 2002 territorial election, in which every incumbent Liberal MLA except party leader Pat Duncan lost their seats.

References

1949 births
Yukon Liberal Party MLAs
Living people
Politicians from Whitehorse
Canadian LGBT people in provincial and territorial legislatures
Gay politicians
21st-century Canadian LGBT people
Canadian gay men